Yagunovo (Yawın) is a rural locality (a village) in Ibrayevsky Selsoviet, Kiginsky District, Bashkortostan, Russia. The population was 176 as of 2010. There are 5 streets.

Geography 
Yagunovo is located 24 km southwest of Verkhniye Kigi (the district's administrative centre) by road. Staromikhametovo is the nearest rural locality.

References 

Rural localities in Kiginsky District